The 2010 China Open was a tennis tournament played on outdoor hard courts. It was the 12th edition of the China Open for the men (14th for the women), and is part of the ATP 500 Series of the 2010 ATP World Tour, and of the Premier Series of the 2010 WTA Tour. Both the men's and the women's events were held at the Olympic Green Tennis Center in Beijing, People's Republic of China, from October 1 through October 11, 2010. Due to rain the singles finals were postponed from Sunday, October 10 to Monday, October 11.

WTA entrants

Seeds

 1 Rankings are as of September 27, 2010.

Other entrants
The following players received wildcards into the singles main draw:
  Han Xinyun
  Peng Shuai
  Sun Shengnan
  Zhang Shuai
  Zhou Yimiao

The following players received entry from the qualifying draw:
  Kateryna Bondarenko
  Vera Dushevina
  Lu Jingjing
  Bojana Jovanovski
  Alla Kudryavtseva
  Ekaterina Makarova
  Anastasija Sevastova
  Roberta Vinci

ATP entrants

Seeds

 Rankings are as of September 27, 2010.

Other entrants
The following players received wildcards into the singles main draw:
  Gong Maoxin
  John Isner
  Yang Tsung-hua

The following players received entry from the qualifying draw:
  Michael Berrer
  Łukasz Kubot 
  Illya Marchenko
  Paul-Henri Mathieu

Champions

Men's singles

 Novak Djokovic def.  David Ferrer, 6–2, 6–4
It was Djokovic's 2nd title of the year and 18th of his career. It was his 2nd win at Beijing, defending his title.

Women's singles

 Caroline Wozniacki def.  Vera Zvonareva, 6–3, 3–6, 6–3
It was Wozniacki's 6th title of the year and 12th of her career.

Men's doubles

 Bob Bryan /  Mike Bryan def.  Mariusz Fyrstenberg /  Marcin Matkowski, 6–1, 7–6(7–5)

Women's doubles

 Chuang Chia-jung /  Olga Govortsova def.  Gisela Dulko /  Flavia Pennetta, 7–6(7–2), 1–6, [10–7].

References

External links
Official website